Madeleine Jane Woolley, who performs as Maddy Jane (born 1996), is an Australian singer-songwriter and guitarist from Bruny Island.

In 2015, she released her debut single "People". In 2017, she released the singles "No Other Way" and "Thank You and Sorry". All three singles featured on her debut extended play, Not Human at All, which was released on 2 March 2018.

She has supported the Australian leg of tours by Harry Styles (November 2017) and by Red Hot Chili Peppers (2019).

She released her debut album Not All Bad or Good on 1 May 2020.

Early life
Madeleine Jane Woolley was born in 1996 and was raised in Lunawanna, Bruny Island. Her parents owned a vineyard. She later described the place, "you are used to waving to everyone and knowing everyone. I have learnt to be more comfortable in bigger situations, because I am just a little small town girl. I have definitely had to get used to the scale of things."

Career

2015–17: "People" and Not Human at All
Woolley released her debut single "People" in 2015. She released her second single, "Drown It Out", in December 2016.  Follow-up singles "No Other Way" and "Thank You and Sorry" were released in 2017. All three singles featured on her debut extended play, Not Human at All, which was released on 2 March 2018 via Lemon Tree Music/Sony Music Australia.
. Dylan Marshall of The AU Review observed, "for the uninitiated, if you had to find an artist that is a cross somewhere between the wit and drawl of Courtney Barnett, Camp Cope's honesty and lyricism and the guitar hooks of early San Cisco, then you'd find someone that resembles [Jane]."

2017–19: Touring with Harry Styles and Red Hot Chili Peppers
Woolley supported the Australian leg of tours by Harry Styles in November 2017 and by Red Hot Chili Peppers in 2019.

Australian surf and garage rock band, Skegss, have performed cover versions of her tracks, including "I Know What I Know Already", "Ideal", "No Other Way", "Not Human at All", and "People".

2020–present: Not All Bad or Good
Woolley's debut album Not All Bad or Good was released on 1 May 2020.

On 26 June 2020, Woolley performed Natasha Bedingfield's "Unwritten" as part of Triple J's Like a Version segment.

Discography

Studio albums

Extended plays

Singles

Notes

References

1996 births
Australian musicians
21st-century Australian singers
21st-century Australian women singers
Living people
Sony Music Australia artists